Yagur is a kibbutz in northern Israel. Located on the northeastern slopes of Mount Carmel, about 9 km southeast of Haifa, it falls under the jurisdiction of Zevulun Regional Council.

History

Yagur was founded in 1922 by a settlement group called Ahva (Brotherhood). Its name was taken from an Arab village called "Yajur" nearby. 

There is a site with a similar name (Jagur) mentioned in the Book of Joshua 15:21, though it was located in territory belonging to the Tribe of Judah, far to the south. At first, the members worked drying up the swamps surrounding the Kishon River and preparing the land for permanent settlement. They established various agricultural divisions and the kibbutz began to grow.

On 11 April 1931 three members of the kibbutz were killed by members of a cell of the Black Hand.

During the Mandate era, Yagur was an important center for the Haganah. During Operation Agatha on 29 June 1946, the British army conducted a major raid on the kibbutz and located a major arms depot hidden there after receiving a tip from informants. More than 300 rifles, some 100 2-inch mortars, more than 400,000 bullets, some 5,000 grenades and 78 revolvers were confiscated. Many members of the kibbutz were arrested.

Economy
The economy is now based on diversified agriculture and industry. The kibbutz operates a 5-month work-study program for young adults (18-28) in which participants learn conversational Hebrew and work in the kibbutz.

Notable people

 Yisrael Bar-Yehuda (1895–1965), Knesset member
 Uziel Gal (1923–2002), designer of the Uzi submachine gun
 Yoel Marcus (1932–2022), Haaretz commentator
 Itamar Marzel (born 1949), basketball player
 Yoram Taharlev (1938–2022), poet, lyricist, author
 Ruth Westheimer (born Karola Siegel, 1928; known as "Dr. Ruth"), German-American sex therapist, talk show host, author, professor, Holocaust survivor, and former Haganah sniper
 Assaf Yaguri (1931–2000), Knesset member

Gallery

References

Further reading
Sefer Yagur, circa 1961-1962, published by the kibbutz to commemorate the 40th anniversary
Yagur as it is, undated, circa 1971-1972, published by the kibbutz to commemorate the 50th anniversary

External links
Kibbutz website 
Kibbutz Yagur Collection (in Hebrew) on the Digital collections of Younes and Soraya Nazarian Library, University of Haifa

Kibbutzim
Kibbutz Movement
Populated places established in 1922
Populated places in Haifa District
1922 establishments in Mandatory Palestine